Enrico Baroni (24 November 1892 – 28 June 1940) was an Italian naval officer during World War II.

Biography 
Born in Florence in 1892, Enrico Baroni enrolled in the Italian Naval Academy in Livorno on 10 November 1911, and graduated in 1914 with the rank of Ensign. During World War I he served first on the battleships Roma and Conte di Cavour, then on the armored cruiser Pisa and finally, as the first fire control officer, on the battleship Dante Alighieri. At the end of the war, he was assigned to the Technical Office of Naval Weapons in Venice and stationed on the repair ship Quarnaro.

He was then given command of the torpedo boat Cortellazzo and, after promotion to Lieutenant Commander, of the destroyer . In 1932 he was promoted to Commander and appointed executive officer of the heavy cruiser Fiume, and afterwards he held the post of Superior Commander in the Far East, with insignia on the minelayer Lepanto. After repatriation, he was promoted to Captain and appointed commander of the Cagliari Naval Command for a period, before being given command of the light cruiser Luigi Cadorna.

Baroni decided to hold back the British cruisers with his ship as long as possible, so as to give Ostro and Zeffiro the time needed to escape; Espero's sacrifice in fact allowed the two sister ships to escape and reach Benghazi and then Tobruk.
Espero, after a solitary two-hour battle against Tovey's ships, was finally hit by the cruiser's fire, left dead in the water, and finished off by HMAS Sydney. After giving orders for the scuttling and the abandonment of the ship, Baroni returned to the bridge and went down with his ship. He was posthumously awarded the Gold Medal of Military Valor.

References

1892 births
1940 deaths
Recipients of the Gold Medal of Military Valor
Regia Marina personnel of World War II
People lost at sea
Italian military personnel killed in World War II
Captains who went down with the ship
Military personnel from Florence